Giorgos Constanti  (born 19 September 1980) is a Cypriot footballer who played for Cypriot side Akritas Chlorakas.

External links

1980 births
Living people
Sportspeople from Limassol
Cypriot footballers
Cyprus international footballers
Association football midfielders
Cypriot First Division players
Super League Greece players
AEL Limassol players
Xanthi F.C. players
AC Omonia players
APEP FC players
Ermis Aradippou FC players
Akritas Chlorakas players